FHG may refer to:

 Force Headquarters Group, a United States Marine Corps Reserve unit
 Fort Henry Guard, a Canadian military re-enactment organization
 Fragmenta Historicorum Graecorum, Karl Wilhelm Ludwig Müller's collection of fragments of the works of ancient Greek historians
 Fraunhofer Society
 Free hosted gallery, a type of free web content, usual pornography
 Freiwilliger Helfer der Grenztruppen, the Voluntary Auxiliary of the Border Police of East Germany
 "Fuck Her Gently", a song by Tenacious D
 The Deutsche Bahn station abbreviation for the Haiger station, in Germany